Miroslav "Mire" Radošević (born February 6, 1973) is a Serbian basketball coach and former player. He currently serves as an assistant coach for the Banvit of the Turkish Super League and the Champions League.

Radošević won the gold medal at the 1997 FIBA European Championship with Yugoslav national team.

Post-playing career 
After finished his playing career in 2007, Radošević became a sports director of his hometown club Sloboda. He worked there until 2015.
Prior to the 2016–17 season, he was named for Banvit of the Turkish Super League.

References

External links
 Miroslav Radošević at tblstat.net
 Miroslav Radošević at legabasket.it
 Miroslav Radošević at euroleague.net

1973 births
Living people
Asseco Gdynia players
Bandırma B.İ.K. players
FIBA EuroBasket-winning players
KK Borac Čačak players
KK Sloboda Užice coaches
KK Sloboda Užice players
KK Partizan players
Roseto Sharks players
Sportspeople from Užice
Serbian basketball executives and administrators
Serbian expatriate basketball people in Italy
Serbian expatriate basketball people in Poland
Serbian expatriate basketball people in Turkey
Serbian men's basketball coaches
Serbian men's basketball players
Shooting guards
Türk Telekom B.K. players